Lucinoma is a genus of saltwater clams, marine bivalve molluscs in the subfamily Codakiinae of the family Lucinidae.

Species
 
 † Lucinoma acutilineata (Conrad, 1849) 
 Lucinoma aequalis (Thiele, 1931)
 Lucinoma aequizonata (Stearns, 1890)
 Lucinoma anemiophila Holmes, P. G. Oliver & Sellanes, 2005
 Lucinoma annulata (Reeve, 1850)
 † Lucinoma aokii Hirayama, 1958 
 Lucinoma asapheus P. G. Oliver, Rodrigues & M. R. Cunha, 2011
 Lucinoma atalantae Cosel, 2006
 Lucinoma atlantis (McLean, 1936)
 Lucinoma bengalensis (E. A. Smith, 1894)
 † Lucinoma bermudensis (Dall, 1901) 
 Lucinoma blakeana (Bush, 1893)
 Lucinoma borealis (Linnaeus, 1767)
 † Lucinoma canudai Kiel, Aguilar & Kase, 2020 
 Lucinoma capensis (Jaeckel & Thiele, 1931)
 Lucinoma coselia (Glover & J. D. Taylor, 2007)
 Lucinoma dulcinea Cosel & Bouchet, 2008
 Lucinoma estasia Glover & J. D. Taylor, 2016
 Lucinoma euclia (Cotton & Godfrey, 1938)
 Lucinoma filosa (Stimpson, 1851)
 Lucinoma gabrieli (Chapman, 1941)
 Lucinoma gagei P. G. Oliver & Holmes, 2006
 Lucinoma galathea Marwick, 1953
 † Lucinoma gracilistriata Hirayama, 1954 
 Lucinoma heroica (Dall, 1901)
 Lucinoma kastoroae Cosel & Bouchet, 2008
 Lucinoma kazani Salas & Woodside, 2002
 † Lucinoma kosatorea Kiel, Aguilar & Kase, 2020 
 Lucinoma lamellata (E. A. Smith, 1881)
 Lucinoma myriamae Cosel, 2006
 Lucinoma percirrata (Cotton & Godfrey, 1938)
 † Lucinoma perusina (Sacco, 1901) 
 Lucinoma rhomboidalis Cosel & Bouchet, 2008
 † Lucinoma saetheri Amano, Little & K. A. Campbell, 2018 
 Lucinoma saldanhae (Barnard, 1964)
 † Lucinoma shinokii Hirayama, 1954 
 Lucinoma sibogae Cosel & Bouchet, 2008
 Lucinoma soliditesta (Okutani & Hashimoto, 1997)
 Lucinoma spectabilis (Yokoyama, 1920)
 Lucinoma taiwanensis Cosel & Bouchet, 2008
 † Lucinoma taylori (Powell, 1935) 
 Lucinoma thula J. D. Taylor & Glover, 2017
 † Lucinoma tinagoensis Kiel, Aguilar & Kase, 2020 
 † Lucinoma velosoi Kiel, Aguilar & Kase, 2020 
 Lucinoma vestita (Dautzenberg & H. Fischer, 1906)
 Lucinoma yoshidai Habe, 1958
 † Lucinoma zapotalensis (Olsson, 1931)

References

 Glover, E.A. & Taylor, J.D. (2007). Diversity of chemosymbiotic bivalves on coral reefs: Lucinidae (Mollusca Bivalvia) of New Caledonia and Lifou. Zoosystema. 29(1): 109-181.
 Glover E.A. & Taylor J.D. (2016). Lucinidae of the Philippines: highest known diversity and ubiquity of chemosymbiotic bivalves from intertidal to bathyal depths (Mollusca: Bivalvia). in: Héros V. et al. (eds) Tropical Deep-Sea Benthos 29. Mémoires du Muséum national d'Histoire naturelle. 208: 65-234
 Coan, E. V.; Valentich-Scott, P. (2012). Bivalve seashells of tropical West America. Marine bivalve mollusks from Baja California to northern Peru. 2 vols, 1258 pp.

External links
 Dall W.H. (1901). Synopsis of the Lucinacea and of the American species. Proceedings of the United States National Museum. 23: 779-833, pls 39-42

Lucinidae
Bivalve genera